Shivaramagouda Sivanagouda (born 3 February 1954 Sugur, District Bellary) is an Indian politician from Karnataka State and member of the Bhartiya Janata Party. He is member of 15th Lok Sabha from Koppal since June 2009.

Shivaramagouda studied Law and resides at Gangavathi in Koppal district. He won the Lok Sabha elections with a record setting margin of Over 89,000 votes, the highest margin won by any Lok Sabha member of Koppal constituency.  he is the Vice President of Karnataka housing board and also associated with many film boards and theatre associations.

References 

Bharatiya Janata Party politicians from Karnataka
India MPs 2009–2014
Lok Sabha members from Karnataka
People from Bellary district
People from Koppal district
1953 births
Living people